Crosby Ravensworth is a civil parish in the Eden District, Cumbria, England. It contains 53 buildings that are recorded in the National Heritage List for England. Of these, one is listed at Grade I, the highest of the three grades, six are at Grade II*, the middle grade, and the others are at Grade II, the lowest grade.  The parish contains the villages of Crosby Ravensworth, Maulds Meaburn, Reagill, the small settlement of Oddendale, and the surrounding countryside.  Most of the listed buildings are country houses, smaller houses, and associated structures, farmhouses and farm buildings.  The other listed buildings include a church and items in the churchyard, bridges, monuments, a village hall, and a parish boundary stone.


Key

Buildings

References

Citations

Sources

Lists of listed buildings in Cumbria